Lieutenant Joseph Emmett Stauffer (October 29, 1874 – April 10, 1917) was a teacher, politician and soldier from Alberta.

Early life
Joseph Emmett Stauffer was born October 29, 1874 in Manassas, Virginia to parents of German-Swiss ancestry. He moved to Canada at a young age with his family, and was educated at Berlin, Ontario. He married Emma Ernst. Stauffer worked as a real estate agent, forest ranger, and Homestead Inspector.

Political career
Stauffer was elected to the Alberta Legislature in the 1909 Alberta legislature. In that election he defeated incumbent Cornelius Hiebert in a landslide in the new Didsbury district.

He was re-elected to a second term in office in the 1913 Alberta legislature, winning with a comfortable but reduced plurality.

Military career
Stauffer enlisted in the Canadian Expeditionary Force and served overseas with the Canadian Infantry (Alberta Regiment) 50th Battalion in World War I. He kept his seat in the provincial legislature while he was overseas fighting in the war. On April 10, 1917 he was killed in action during the Battle of Vimy Ridge.

Lieutenant Governor Robert Brett honored Stauffer's memory and military service by making special note in the Throne Speech at the opening of the 4th Alberta Legislative Assembly on February 7, 1918.

The small town of Stauffer, Alberta is named in his honor.

References

External links

Lieutenant Joseph Emmitt Stauffer – Canadian Great War Project

1874 births
1917 deaths
People from Manassas, Virginia
Alberta Liberal Party MLAs
Military personnel from Virginia
Canadian military personnel killed in World War I
Canadian Expeditionary Force officers
American emigrants to Canada
Canadian people of Swiss descent